Imma semiclara is a moth in the family Immidae. It was described by Edward Meyrick in 1929. It is found on the Marquesas Islands in French Polynesia.

References

Moths described in 1929
Immidae
Moths of Oceania